The Sam Noble Oklahoma Museum of Natural History is a natural history museum located on the campus of the University of Oklahoma. The museum was founded in 1899 by an act of the Oklahoma Territorial Legislature. Its current building was completed in 1999. The museum contains approximately "7 million objects and specimens in 12 collections." It has almost  of exhibit space, with five galleries and exhibits that provide an in-depth tour of Oklahoma's natural history. It is "one of the world's largest university-based natural history museums."

Before its 1999 relocation and expansion, the original museum chartered by the Legislature in 1899 had occupied much smaller quarters on campus. It was known as the Stovall Museum of Science & History, named for J. Willis Stovall, a paleontologist and faculty professor who assembled much of the original collection.

Native American languages 
The Annual Oklahoma Native American Youth Language Fair is held at the museum every April. In 2013, the fair set a new record for attendance, with 921 Native American language students representing 46 different languages. Over 72 languages are held in the museum archives.

The museum holds the Durbin Feeling Collection, named for a Cherokee linguist who published a Cherokee-English dictionary in 1975 and many texts since then on this language and its syllabary. He taught Cherokee for years at the university level. He encouraged the revitalization of the language in the Cherokee Nation and training of new speakers. This collection contains his Cherokee-language materials from years of research, and letters written in Cherokee to and from members of Feeling's family.

Notable specimens 
 The world's largest Apatosaurus skeleton.
 The Cooper Skull, a bison skull, found in 1994, is "the oldest painted object in North America."
 A Pentaceratops skeleton with a very large skull that is 3.1 meters high, the largest skull of any known land vertebrate. The skull was excavated in 1941, but was not removed from its rock matrix until 1995. Though some debate exists if the skull is that of a Pentaceratops or the holotype of a different ceratopsian Titanoceratops, the Sam Noble Museum maintains the original Pentaceratops classification. 
 A skeletal reconstruction of Saurophaganax, a giant Morrison Allosaurid.
 A number of Mississippian culture stone effigy pipes and other artifacts from the Craig Mound at the Spiro Site.

Gallery

References

External links 
Official website

Natural history museums in Oklahoma
University museums in Oklahoma
University of Oklahoma campus
Museums established in 1899
Dinosaur museums in the United States
Museums in Cleveland County, Oklahoma
Native American museums in Oklahoma
Native American language revitalization
Paleontology in Oklahoma
1899 establishments in Oklahoma Territory